Jiří Kopal (born 9 November 1989) is a Czech municipal politician.

Life and charity work 
Kopal graduated from the Grammar School in Český Krumlov. He continued his studies at the University of South Bohemia in České Budějovice at the Faculty of Health and Social Studies, where he obtained a bachelor's degree in Public health protection. He is also studying General medicine at the Faculty of Medicine of Charles University in Plzeň.

Since 2015, he has been involved in charitable work, becoming the coordinator of the international organization Lazarus Union in the Czech Republic and later in Slovakia. In 2022, he was elected Deputy Secretary General of the Lazarus Union and a member of the Executive Board.

He was nominated by the Regional Association of the Czech Red Cross in Český Krumlov for the Life-Saving Plaque when he saved a senior's life in 2017. The award was given to him on 14 May 2018 in the Main Hall of the Wallenstein Palace in Prague.

In 2020, he launched an initiative to award a state award in memoriam to war veteran Jan Horal. The initiative was successful, Medal of Merit was presented to Jan Horal's descendant at a postponed ceremony on 7 March 2022 in the Vladislav Hall at Prague Castle. Jiří Kopal personally attended the handover at Prague Castle.

He cooperates with veteran associations and participates in events with war veterans. He participates in the creation of the Community center for war veterans in České Budějovice and also in the creation of the Clubhouse for war veterans in Český Krumlov.

On 15 December 2022, he became a representative of the town of Český Krumlov.

Honors and decorations 
  Commemorative Medal – 80th Anniversary of Operation Anthropoid (2022)
  Commemorative Medal of the Czech War Veterans Association – 30th Anniversary of the UNPROFOR Mission (2022)
  Commemorative Medal of the Czech War Veterans Association and the Czechoslovak Association of Legionaries Vimperk - II. annual meeting of war veterans of the 68th Motorized Rifle Regiment (2019)
  Life-Saving Plaque (2018)

References 

1989 births
Living people
Paramedics
People from České Budějovice
Czech politicians
Charles University alumni